Inner Senses is a 2002 Hong Kong psychological horror film directed by Law Chi-leung and starring Leslie Cheung and Karena Lam. The film explores themes on hallucination, clinical depression, psychological trauma and suicide. It was also the last film Cheung acted in before he killed himself on 1 April 2003.

Summary
Psychiatrist Dr. Jim Law tries to treat his patient, Cheung Yan, a woman who believes that she sees ghosts. Law does not believe in the supernatural and thinks that she is repressing her past. Law reads Yan's diaries to better understand her psyche and learns that her parents are divorced and do not care for her. Yan's condition improves gradually and they develop a romantic relationship at the same time.

However, Law feels that he cannot become too close to Yan because she is his patient and tries to convey the message to her indirectly. Yan understands his words and feels hurt, as she thinks that he is dumping her in the same way as her ex-boyfriend did. She starts having hallucinations again and sees the spirits of her landlord's deceased wife and son, after which she attempts suicide by overdosing on antidepressants and slitting her wrist, but survives. Law travels to Yan's apartment later and hears strange noises in the bathroom and thinks that her neighbour upstairs is responsible. Once, Law sees a female ghost while looking out of his window, and sees her again on another two occasions while driving and swimming. He starts taking antidepressants as well and tries to electrocute himself, but is rescued in time and recovers.

Law eventually helps Yan recover from her mental illness by reuniting her with her parents. Following that, he starts dating Yan as she is no longer his patient. While in a restaurant one day, Law is attacked by a woman, whom he remembers to be the mother of the ghost he saw. He starts having nightmares and begins sleepwalking, behaving erratically and reacting violently when Yan and his colleagues ask him. The ghost that Law sees is actually Siu-yu, his ex-girlfriend in high school, who committed suicide after Law broke up with her. Law has visions of Siu-yu following him wherever he goes and flees in horror until he finally reaches the top of a building. He is confronted by Siu-yu's ghost, who wants to force him to jump off. Law shows remorse for causing Siu-yu's death and the ghost disappears. After that, he sees Yan walking towards him and embraces her, and the film ends with both of them sitting together on the top of the building.

Cast
Leslie Cheung as Jim Law
Hugo Chim as young Jim Law
Karena Lam as Cheung Yan
Waise Lee as Wilson Chan
Valerie Chow as Mrs Chan
Norman Chui as Mr Chu
Maggie Poon as Cheung Siu-yu
Samuel Lam as Professor Fong
Leung Tin as Hospital director
So Hang-suen as Siu-yu's mother
Wong Shu-tong as Siu-yu's father
Lee Pui-shing as Mike
Courtney Wu as Swimming pool custodian
Olivia Wong as Jim's assistant
Liu Hongdou as Yan's mother
Sun Liwen as Yan's father
Jova Yuen as Jim's friend
Tony Wong as Bathroom ghost
Ho Pui-san as Mike's girlfriend
Stefan Kratz as Foreign student
Helda Chan as Jim's classmate
Wat Wai-kwok as Head nurse
Josephine Choi as Jim's maid
Lai Pui-yin as Chu's wife
Lee Ting-fung as Chu's son
Stanley Wong as Man living upstairs
Zerisawa as Pool security

Release
Inner Senses was released in Hong Kong on 28 March 2002. In the Philippines, the film was released on 24 September 2003, with the marketing exploiting the death of Leslie Cheung by stating it occurred under the same circumstances as what happened to his character Jim Law.

Accolades

References

External links

2002 films
2000s psychological horror films
2002 horror films
Cantonese-language films
Films about mental health
Films about physicians
Films directed by Law Chi-leung
Films set in Hong Kong
Films shot in Hong Kong
Golden Harvest films
Hong Kong ghost films
Hong Kong horror films
Hong Kong supernatural horror films
Hong Kong psychological horror films
2000s Hong Kong films